

Events

Pre-1600
 394 – Battle of the Frigidus: Roman emperor Theodosius I defeats and kills Eugenius the usurper. His Frankish magister militum Arbogast escapes but commits suicide two days later.
1492 – Christopher Columbus sails from La Gomera in the Canary Islands, his final port of call before crossing the Atlantic Ocean for the first time.
1522 – The Victoria returns to Sanlúcar de Barrameda in Spain, the only surviving ship of Ferdinand Magellan's expedition and the first known ship to circumnavigate the world.

1601–1900
1620 – The Pilgrims sail from Plymouth, England on the Mayflower to settle in North America. (Old Style date; September 16 per New Style date.)
1628 – Puritans settle Salem, which became part of Massachusetts Bay Colony.
1634 – Thirty Years' War: In the Battle of Nördlingen, the Catholic Imperial army defeats Swedish and German Protestant forces.
1642 – England's Long Parliament bans public stage-plays. 
1781 – American Revolutionary War: The Battle of Groton Heights takes place, resulting in a British victory.
1803 – British scientist John Dalton begins using symbols to represent the atoms of different elements.
1861 – American Civil War: Forces under Union General Ulysses S. Grant bloodlessly capture Paducah, Kentucky, giving the Union control of the Tennessee River's mouth.
1863 – American Civil War: Confederate forces evacuate Battery Wagner and Morris Island in South Carolina.
1870 – Louisa Ann Swain of Laramie, Wyoming becomes the first woman in the United States to cast a vote legally after 1807.
1885 – Eastern Rumelia declares its union with Bulgaria, thus accomplishing Bulgarian unification.

1901–present
1901 – Leon Czolgosz, an unemployed anarchist, shoots and fatally wounds US President William McKinley at the Pan-American Exposition in Buffalo, New York.
1914 – World War I: The First Battle of the Marne, which would halt the Imperial German Army's advance into France, begins. 
1930 – Democratically elected Argentine president Hipólito Yrigoyen is deposed in a military coup.
1936 – Spanish Civil War: The Interprovincial Council of Asturias and León is established.
1939 – World War II: The British Royal Air Force suffers its first fighter pilot casualty of the Second World War at the Battle of Barking Creek as a result of friendly fire.
  1939   – World War II: South Africa declares war on Germany.
1940 – King Carol II of Romania abdicates and is succeeded by his son Michael. General Ion Antonescu becomes the Conducător of Romania.
1943 – The Monterrey Institute of Technology is founded in Monterrey, Mexico as one of the largest and most influential private universities in Latin America.
  1943   – Pennsylvania Railroad's premier train derails at Frankford Junction in Philadelphia, killing 79 people and injuring 117 others.
1944 – World War II: The city of Ypres, Belgium is liberated by Allied forces.
  1944   – World War II: Soviet forces capture the city of Tartu, Estonia.
1946 – United States Secretary of State James F. Byrnes announces that the U.S. will follow a policy of economic reconstruction in postwar Germany.
1952 – A prototype aircraft crashes at the Farnborough Airshow in Hampshire, England, killing 29 spectators and the two on board.
1955 – Istanbul's Greek, Jewish, and Armenian minorities are the target of a government-sponsored pogrom; dozens are killed in ensuing riots.
1962 – The United States government begins the Exercise Spade Fork nuclear readiness drill.
  1962   – Archaeologist Peter Marsden discovers the first of the Blackfriars Ships dating back to the second century AD in the Blackfriars area of the banks of the River Thames in London.
1965 – India retaliates following Pakistan's Operation Grand Slam which results in the Indo-Pakistani War of 1965 that ends in a stalemate followed by the signing of the Tashkent Declaration.
1966 – Prime Minister Hendrik Verwoerd, the architect of apartheid, is stabbed to death in Cape Town, South Africa during a parliamentary meeting.
1968 – Swaziland becomes independent.
1970 – Two passenger jets bound from Europe to New York are simultaneously hijacked by Palestinian terrorist members of the PFLP and taken to Dawson's Field, Jordan.
1971 – Paninternational Flight 112 crashes on the Bundesautobahn 7 highway near Hamburg Airport, in Hamburg, Germany, killing 22.
1972 – Munich massacre: Nine Israeli athletes die (along with a German policeman) at the hands of the Palestinian "Black September" terrorist group after being taken hostage at the Munich Olympic Games. Two other Israeli athletes were slain in the initial attack the previous day.
1976 – Cold War: Soviet Air Defence Forces pilot Viktor Belenko lands a Mikoyan-Gurevich MiG-25 jet fighter at Hakodate in Japan and requests political asylum in the United States; his request is granted.
1983 – The Soviet Union admits to shooting down Korean Air Lines Flight 007, stating that its operatives did not know that it was a civilian aircraft when it reportedly violated Soviet airspace.
1985 – Midwest Express Airlines Flight 105 crashes near Milwaukee Mitchell International Airport in Milwaukee, Wisconsin, killing all 31 people on board.
1986 – In Istanbul, two terrorists from Abu Nidal's organization kill 22 and wound six congregants inside the Neve Shalom Synagogue during Shabbat services.
1991 – The Soviet Union recognizes the independence of the Baltic states Estonia, Latvia, and Lithuania.
  1991   – The Russian parliament approves the name change of Leningrad back to Saint Petersburg. The change is effective October 1.
1995 – Cal Ripken Jr. of the Baltimore Orioles plays in his 2,131st consecutive game, breaking a record that had stood for 56 years.
1997 – The Funeral of Diana, Princess of Wales takes place in London. Well over a million people lined the streets and 2 billion watched around the world on television.
2003 – Mahmoud Abbas resigns from his position of Palestinian Prime Minister.
2007 – Israel executes the air strike Operation Orchard to destroy a nuclear reactor in Syria.
2009 – The ro-ro ferry SuperFerry 9 sinks off the Zamboanga Peninsula in the Philippines with 971 persons aboard; all but ten are rescued.
2012 – Sixty-one people die after a fishing boat capsizes off the İzmir Province coast of Turkey, near the Greek Aegean islands.
2013 – Forty-one elephants are poisoned with cyanide in salt pans, by poachers in Hwange National Park.
2018 – Supreme Court of India decriminalised all consensual sex among adults in private, making homosexuality legal on the Indian lands.
2022 – Boris Johnson resigns as Prime Minister of the United Kingdom, and is replaced by Liz Truss. 
  2022   – Russo-Ukrainian War: Ukraine begins its Kharkiv counteroffensive, surprising Russian forces and retaking over 3,000 square kilometers of land, recapturing the entire Kharkiv Oblast west of the Oskil River, within the next week.

Births

Pre-1600
1475 – Artus Gouffier, Lord of Boissy, French nobleman and politician (d. 1519)
  1475   – Sebastiano Serlio, Italian Mannerist architect (d. 1554)

1601–1900
1610 – Francesco I d'Este, Duke of Modena, Italian noble (d. 1658)
1620 – Isabella Leonarda, Italian composer and educator (d. 1704)
1631 – Charles Porter, English-born judge (d. 1696)
1633 – Sebastian Knüpfer, German cantor and composer (d. 1676)
1656 – Guillaume Dubois, French cardinal and politician (d. 1723)
1666 – Ivan V of Russia, Russian tsar (d. 1696)
1711 – Henry Muhlenberg, German-American pastor and missionary (d. 1787)
1729 – Moses Mendelssohn, German philosopher and theologian (d. 1786)
1732 – Johan Wilcke, Swedish physicist and academic (d. 1796)
1757 – Gilbert du Motier, Marquis de Lafayette, French general (d. 1834)
1766 – John Dalton, English chemist, meteorologist, and physicist (d. 1844)
1781 – Vincent Novello, English composer and publisher (d. 1861)
1795 – Frances Wright, Scottish-American author and activist (d. 1852)
1800 – Catharine Beecher, American educator and activist (d. 1878)
1802 – Alcide d'Orbigny, French zoologist, palaeontologist, and geologist (d. 1857)
1814 – George-Étienne Cartier, Canadian lawyer and politician, 9th Premier of East Canada (d. 1873)
1815 – St. John Richardson Liddell, American general (d. 1870)
1817 – Alexander Tilloch Galt, English-Canadian businessman and politician, 1st Canadian Minister of Finance (d. 1893)
1819 – William Rosecrans, American general, politician, and diplomat, United States Ambassador to Mexico (d. 1898)
1838 – Samuel Arnold, American conspirator (d. 1906)
1852 – Schalk Willem Burger, South African commander, lawyer, and politician, 6th President of the South African Republic (d. 1918)
1855 – Ferdinand Hummel, German pianist, composer, and conductor (d. 1928)
1857 – Zelia Nuttall, American archeologist and historian (d. 1933)
1859 – Macpherson Robertson, Australian businessman and philanthropist, founded MacRobertson's (d. 1945)
1860 – Jane Addams, American sociologist and author, Nobel Prize laureate (d. 1935)
  1860   – May Jordan McConnel, Australian trade unionist and suffragist (d. 1929)
1861 – William Lane, English-Australian journalist, founded New Australia (d. 1917)
1863 – Jessie Willcox Smith, American illustrator (d. 1935)
1868 – Heinrich Häberlin, Swiss judge and politician, President of the Swiss National Council (d. 1947)
1869 – Walford Davies, English organist and composer (d. 1941)
  1869   – Felix Salten, Austrian-Swiss author and critic (d. 1945)
1876 – John Macleod, Scottish physician and physiologist, Nobel Prize laureate (d. 1935)
1879 – Max Schreck, German actor (d. 1936)
  1879   – Joseph Wirth, German educator and politician, Chancellor of Germany (d. 1956)
1885 – Otto Kruger, American actor (d. 1974)
1888 – Joseph P. Kennedy Sr., American businessman and diplomat, 44th United States Ambassador to the United Kingdom (d. 1969)
1889 – Louis Silvers, American composer (d. 1954)
1890 – Clara Kimball Young, American actress and producer (d. 1960)
1892 – Edward Victor Appleton, English-Scottish physicist and academic, Nobel Prize laureate (d. 1965)
1893 – Claire Lee Chennault, American general and pilot (d. 1958)
1899 – Billy Rose, American composer and manager (d. 1966)
1900 – W. A. C. Bennett, Canadian businessman and politician, 25th Premier of British Columbia (d. 1979)
  1900   – Julien Green, French-American author (d. 1998)

1901–present
1906 – Luis Federico Leloir, French-Argentinian physician and biochemist, Nobel Prize laureate (d. 1987)
1908 – Anthony Wagner, English genealogist and academic (d. 1995)
  1908   – Korczak Ziolkowski, American sculptor, designed the Crazy Horse Memorial (d. 1982)
1909 – Michael Gordon, American actor and director (d. 1993)
1910 – Walter Giesler, American soccer player, referee, and coach (d. 1976)
1911 – Harry Danning, American baseball player and coach (d. 2004)
  1911   – Charles Deutsch, French aerodynamics engineer and automobile maker, co-founder of the brand "DB (d. 1980)
1912 – Wayne Barlow, American organist, composer, and director (d. 1996)
1913 – Julie Gibson, American actress and singer (d. 2019)
  1913   – Leônidas, Brazilian footballer (d. 2004)
1915 – Ed Oliver, American golfer (d. 1961)
  1915   – Franz Josef Strauss, German lieutenant and politician, Minister President of Bavaria (d. 1988)
1917 – John Berry, American-French actor, director, producer, and screenwriter (d. 1999)
  1917   – George Mann, English cricketer (d. 2001) 
  1917   – Philipp von Boeselager, German soldier and economist (d. 2008)
1919 – Wilson Greatbatch, American engineer and philanthropist (d. 2011)
1920 – Elvira Pagã, Brazilian actress, singer, and author (d. 2003)
1921 – Carmen Laforet, Spanish author (d. 2004)
  1921   – Norman Joseph Woodland, American inventor, co-created the bar code (d. 2012)
1922 – Adriano Moreira, Portuguese politician, Minister of the Overseas Provinces, President of the CDS – People's Party (d. 2022)
1923 – Peter II of Yugoslavia (d. 1970)
1924 – John Melcher, American veterinarian and politician (d. 2018)
1925 – Andrea Camilleri, Italian author, screenwriter, and director (d. 2019)
  1925   – Jimmy Reed, American singer-songwriter and guitarist (d. 1976)
1926 – Prince Claus of the Netherlands (d. 2002)
  1926   – Jack English Hightower, American lawyer and politician (d. 2013)
  1926   – Arthur Oldham, English composer and conductor (d. 2003)
  1926   – Maurice Prather, American photographer and director (d. 2001)
1928 – Fumihiko Maki, Japanese architect and academic, designed the Tokyo Metropolitan Gymnasium and Makuhari Messe
  1928   – Robert M. Pirsig, American novelist and philosopher (d. 2017)
  1928   – Yevgeny Svetlanov, Russian conductor and composer (d. 2002)
  1928   – Sid Watkins, English neurosurgeon and academic (d. 2012)
1929 – Yash Johar, Indian film producer, founded Dharma Productions (d. 2005)
  1929   – Ljubov Rebane, Estonian physicist and mathematician (d. 1991)
1930 – Charles Foley, American game designer, co-created Twister (d. 2013)
  1930   – Helmut Piirimäe, Estonian historian and academic (d. 2017)
1931 – Bud Shrake, American journalist, author, and screenwriter (d. 2009)
1932 – Colin McColl, English intelligence officer
  1932   – Gilles Tremblay, Canadian composer and educator (d. 2017)
1935 – Isabelle Collin Dufresne, French actress and author (d. 2014)
  1935   – Jock Wallace Jr., Scottish footballer and coach (d. 1996)
1937 – Sergio Aragonés, Spanish-Mexican author and illustrator
  1937   – Janusz Kurczab, Polish fencer and mountaineer (d. 2015)
  1937   – Jo Anne Worley, American actress, comedian, and singer
1938 – Joan Tower, American pianist, composer, and conductor
1939 – Brigid Berlin, American actress, painter, and photographer (d. 2020)
  1939   – David Allan Coe, American outlaw country music singer-songwriter and guitarist 
  1939   – Susumu Tonegawa, Japanese biologist and immunologist, Nobel Prize laureate
1940 – John M. Hayes, American scientist (d. 2017)
  1940   – Elizabeth Murray, American painter and illustrator (d. 2007)
  1940   – Jackie Trent, English-Spanish singer-songwriter and actress (d. 2015)
1941 – Roger Law, English illustrator
  1941   – Monica Mason, South African ballerina and director
1942 – Dave Bargeron, American trombonist and tuba player 
  1942   – Richard Hutton, English cricketer
  1942   – Mel McDaniel, American singer-songwriter and guitarist (d. 2011)
1943 – Gordon Birtwistle, English engineer and politician
  1943   – Richard J. Roberts, English biochemist and biologist, Nobel Prize laureate
  1943   – Roger Waters, English singer-songwriter and bass player 
1944 – Donna Haraway, American author, academic, and activist
  1944   – Swoosie Kurtz, American actress
1946 – Roger Knight, English cricketer and educator
  1946   – Shirley M. Malcom, American scientist, academic and educator
1947 – Jane Curtin, American actress and comedian
  1947   – Bruce Rioch, English footballer and manager
  1947   – Jacob Rubinovitz, Polish-Israeli engineer and academic
  1947   – Sylvester, American singer-songwriter (d. 1988)
1948 – Claydes Charles Smith, American guitarist (d. 2006)
1949 – Iris Robinson, Northern Irish politician
1951 – Melih Kibar, Turkish composer (d. 2005)
1952 – Simon Burns, English politician, Minister of State for Transport
  1952   – Vladimir Kazachyonok, Russian footballer, coach, and manager (d. 2017)
  1952   – Buddy Miller, American singer-songwriter, guitarist, and producer 
1954 – Carly Fiorina, American businesswoman and activist 
  1954   – Demetris Kizas, Cypriot footballer
  1954   – Patrick O'Hearn, American bassist and composer 
  1954   – John Sauven, English economist and environmentalist
1955 – Raymond Benson, American author and playwright
1956 – Bill Ritter, American lawyer and politician, 41st Governor of Colorado
  1956   – Steven Yearley, English sociologist and academic
1957 – Ali Divandari, Iranian painter, sculptor, and journalist 
  1957   – Michaëlle Jean, Haitian-Canadian journalist and politician, 27th Governor-General of Canada
  1957   – José Sócrates, Portuguese engineer and politician, 119th Prime Minister of Portugal
1958 – Buster Bloodvessel, English singer-songwriter 
  1958   – Jeff Foxworthy, American comedian, actor, producer, and screenwriter
  1958   – Nigel Westlake, Australian composer and conductor
  1958   – Michael Winslow, American actor
  1958   – The Barbarian, Tongan wrestler
1959 – Bill Root, Canadian ice hockey player
1961 – Simon Reeve, Australian journalist and game show host
  1961   – Wendi Richter, American wrestler
  1961   – Scott Travis, American rock drummer
  1961   – Paul Waaktaar-Savoy,  Norwegian musician and songwriter
1962 – Chris Christie, American lawyer and politician, 55th Governor of New Jersey
  1962   – Marina Kaljurand, Estonian badminton player and diplomat, Estonia Ambassador to Russia
  1962   – Elizabeth Vargas, American journalist
  1962   – Kevin Willis, American basketball player and fashion designer
1963 – Mark Chesnutt, American singer-songwriter and guitarist
  1963   – Pat Nevin, Scottish footballer and sportscaster
  1963   – Alice Sebold, American author
  1963   – Bryan Simonaire, American engineer and politician
  1963   – Geert Wilders, Dutch lawyer and politician
1964 – Rosie Perez, American actress, dancer, and director
1965 – Terry Bickers, English singer-songwriter and guitarist 
  1965   – Darren Clark, Australian sprinter
  1965   – Tony Fleet, Australian darts player
  1965   – Christopher Nolan, Irish author and poet (d. 2009)
  1965   – Van Tiffin, American football player
1967 – William DuVall, American singer-songwriter and guitarist 
  1967   – Macy Gray, American singer-songwriter, producer, and actress
  1967   – Kalli Kalde, Estonian painter and illustrator
  1967   – Milan Lukić, Bosnian Serb convicted of war crimes by the ICTY
  1967   – Igor Štimac, Croatian footballer and manager
1968 – Saeed Anwar, Pakistani cricketer
  1968   – Christopher Brookmyre, Scottish author
  1968   – Paul Rea, American journalist
1969 – Tony DiTerlizzi, American author and illustrator
  1969   – Ben Finegold, American chess player and educator
  1969   – Michellie Jones, Australian-American triathlete
  1969   – CeCe Peniston, American singer-songwriter, actress, and former beauty pageant winner
1970 – Cheyne Coates, Australian singer-songwriter and producer 
  1970   – Igor Korolev, Russian-Canadian ice hockey player and coach (d. 2011)
  1970   – Emily Maitlis, Canadian-English journalist
  1970   – Rhett Miller, American alternative country singer-songwriter and guitarist 
1971 – Devang Gandhi, Indian cricketer 
  1971   – Asko Künnap, Estonian poet and illustrator
  1971   – Dolores O'Riordan, Irish singer-songwriter (d. 2018)
1972 – Idris Elba, English actor
  1972   – Saulius Mikalajūnas, Lithuanian footballer
  1972   – Anika Noni Rose, American actress and singer
1973 – Carlo Cudicini, Italian footballer
  1973   – Greg Rusedski, Canadian-English tennis player and sportscaster
  1973   – Alessandro Troncon, Italian rugby player and coach
1974 – Tim Henman, English tennis player and sportscaster
  1974   – Nina Persson, Swedish singer-songwriter and musician
1975 – Derrek Lee, American baseball player and coach
  1975   – Ryoko Tani, Japanese judoka and politician
1976 – Rodrigo Amarante, Brazilian singer-songwriter and guitarist 
  1976   – Jon Ander López, Spanish footballer (d. 2013)
  1976   – Tom Pappas, American decathlete and coach
1978 – Cisco Adler, American singer-songwriter, guitarist, and producer 
  1978   – Alex Escobar, Venezuelan baseball player
  1978   – Mathew Horne, English actor and screenwriter
  1978   – Homare Sawa, Japanese footballer
1979 – Mike Arnaoutis, Greek boxer
  1979   – Foxy Brown, American rapper 
  1979   – Massimo Maccarone, Italian footballer
  1979   – Carlos Adrián Morales, Mexican footballer
  1979   – Low Ki, American wrestler
1980 – Jillian Hall, American wrestler and singer
  1980   – Kerry Katona, English singer and actress 
  1980   – Samuel Peter, Nigerian boxer
  1980   – Joseph Yobo, Nigerian footballer
1981 – Yuki Abe, Japanese footballer
  1981   – Yumiko Cheng, Hong Kong singer and actress
  1981   – Andrew Richardson, Jamaican cricketer
  1981   – Mark Teahen, American baseball player
1983 – Braun Strowman, American wrestler and strongman
1984 – Helena Ekholm, Swedish skier 
  1984   – William Porterfield, Northern Irish cricketer
1985 – Mitch Moreland, American baseball player
1985 – Małgorzata Rejmer, Polish novelist
1986 – Matt Keating, Australian rugby league player
1987 – Ramiele Malubay, Filipino-American singer
  1987   – Emir Preldžić, Turkish basketball player
1988 – Ray Fujita, French-Japanese actor and singer 
  1988   – Max George, English singer-songwriter and actor 
  1988   – Denis Tonucci, Italian footballer
1989 – Nikos Boutzikos, Greek footballer
  1989   – Kim So-eun, South Korean actress
1990 – Matt McAndrew, American singer-songwriter and guitarist
  1990   – John Wall, American basketball player
1992 – Young Tonumaipea, Samoan rugby league player
1993 – Alex Poythress, American basketball player
  1993   – Mattia Valoti, Italian footballer
1995 – Mustafizur Rahman, Bangladeshi cricketer
1996 – Andrés Tello, Colombian footballer
1997 – Mallory Comerford, American swimmer
  1997   – Jai Field, Australian rugby league player
  1997   – Tsukushi, Japanese wrestler
1998 – Michele Perniola, Italian singer
1999 – Patrick Brasca, Canadian-Taiwanese singer-songwriter
2002 – Leylah Fernandez, Canadian tennis player

Deaths

Pre-1600
 394 – Eugenius, Roman usurper
 926 – Taizu of Liao, Khitan ruler (b. 872)
 952 – Suzaku, emperor of Japan (b. 923)
 957 – Liudolf, duke of Swabia (b. 930)
 972 – John XIII, pope of the Catholic Church (b. 930)
1276 – Vicedomino de Vicedominis, Italian cardinal (b. 1210)
1431 – Demetrios Laskaris Leontares, Byzantine admiral and diplomat
1511 – Ashikaga Yoshizumi, Japanese shōgun (b. 1481)
1553 – Juan de Homedes y Coscon, 47th Grandmaster of the Knights Hospitaller (b. c.1477)
1566 – Suleiman the Magnificent, Ottoman sultan (b. 1494)

1601–1900
1625 – Thomas Dempster, Scottish historian and scholar (b. 1579)
1635 – Metius, Dutch mathematician and astronomer (b. 1571)
1649 – Robert Dudley, English geographer and explorer (b. 1574)
1683 – Jean-Baptiste Colbert, French economist and politician, French Controller-General of Finances (b. 1619)
1708 – Sir John Morden, 1st Baronet, English merchant and philanthropist, founded Morden College (b. 1623)
1748 – Edmund Gibson, English bishop and scholar (b. 1669)
1783 – Carlo Bertinazzi, Italian actor and author (b. 1710)
1808 – Louis-Pierre Anquetil, French historian and author (b. 1723)
1836 – Gaspar Flores de Abrego, three terms mayor of San Antonio, in Spanish Texas (b. 1781)
1868 – Pierre Adolphe Rost, American lawyer, judge, and politician (b. 1797)
1885 – Narcís Monturiol, Spanish engineer, designed the Ictineo I and Ictineo II (b. 1819)
1891 – Charles Jamrach, German-English businessman (b. 1815)

1901–present
1902 – Frederick Abel, English chemist and engineer (b. 1827)
1907 – Sully Prudhomme, French poet and critic, Nobel Prize laureate (b. 1839)
1919 – Lord Charles Beresford, English admiral and politician (b. 1846)
1927 – William Libbey, American target shooter and geographer (b. 1855)
1938 – John Stuart Hindmarsh, English race car driver and pilot (b. 1907)
1939 – Arthur Rackham, English illustrator (b. 1867)
1940 – Thomas Harte (Irish republican), executed prisoner (b. 1915)
1940 – Patrick McGrath (Irish Republican), executed prisoner (b. 1894)
1944 – James Cannon Jr., American Bishop of the Methodist Episcopal Church, South
1945 – John S. McCain Sr., American admiral (b. 1884)
1949 – Walter Widdop, English tenor and actor (b. 1892)
1950 – Olaf Stapledon, English philosopher and author (b. 1886)
1951 – James W. Gerard, American lawyer and diplomat, United States Ambassador to Germany (b. 1867)
1952 – Gertrude Lawrence, English actress, singer, and dancer (b. 1898)
1956 – Witold Hurewicz, Polish mathematician (b. 1904)
  1956   – Lee Jung-seob, North Korean painter (b. 1916)
1959 – Edmund Gwenn, English actor (b. 1877)
  1959   – Kay Kendall, English actress and comedian (b. 1927)
1962 – Hanns Eisler, German-Austrian composer (b. 1898)
  1962   – Seiichiro Kashio, Japanese tennis player (b. 1892)
1966 – Margaret Sanger, American nurse, educator, and activist (b. 1879)
  1966   – Hendrik Verwoerd, Dutch-South African journalist and politician, 7th Prime Minister of South Africa (b. 1901)
1969 – Arthur Friedenreich, Brazilian footballer (b. 1892)
1972 – Perpetrator and victims of the Munich massacre
                Luttif Afif, Palestinian terrorist (b. 1945)
                David Mark Berger, American-Israeli weightlifter (b. 1944)
                Ze'ev Friedman, Polish-Israeli weightlifter (b. 1944)
                Yossef Gutfreund, Israeli wrestling judge (b. 1931)
                Eliezer Halfin, Russian-Israeli wrestler (b. 1948)
                Amitzur Shapira, Russian-Israeli runner and coach (b. 1932)
                Kehat Shorr, Romanian shooting coach (b. 1919)
                Mark Slavin, Israeli wrestler (b. 1954)
                Andre Spitzer, Romanian-Israeli fencer and coach (b. 1945)
                Yakov Springer, Polish-Israeli wrestler and coach (b. 1921)
1974 – Olga Baclanova, Russian-Swiss actress and ballerina (b. 1896)
  1974   – Otto Kruger, American actor (b. 1885)
1978 – Max Decugis, French tennis player (b. 1882)
  1978   – Tom Wilson, American record producer (b. 1931)
1979 – Ronald Binge, English organist and composer (b. 1910)
1982 – Azra Erhat, Turkish archaeologist, author, and academic (b. 1915)
1984 – Ernest Tubb, American singer-songwriter and guitarist (b. 1914)
1985 – Franco Ferrara, Italian conductor and composer (b. 1911)
1986 – Blanche Sweet, American actress (b. 1896)
1988 – Leroy Brown, American wrestler (b. 1950)
1990 – Tom Fogerty, American singer-songwriter and guitarist (b. 1941)
  1990   – Len Hutton, English cricketer and soldier (b. 1916)
1991 – Bob Goldham, Canadian ice hockey player and sportscaster (b. 1922)
1992 – Henry Ephron, American playwright, screenwriter, and producer (b. 1912)
1994 – Nicky Hopkins, English pianist (b. 1944)
  1994   – Max Kaminsky, American trumpet player and bandleader (b. 1908)
1997 – P. H. Newby, English author and broadcaster (b. 1918)
1998 – Akira Kurosawa, Japanese director, producer, and screenwriter (b. 1910)
  1998   – Ric Segreto, American-Filipino singer-songwriter, actor, and journalist (b. 1952)
  1998   – Ernst-Hugo Järegård, Swedish actor (b. 1928)
1999 – Lagumot Harris, Nauruan politician, 3rd President of Nauru (b. 1938)
  1999   – René Lecavalier, Canadian sportscaster (b. 1918)
2005 – Hasan Abidi, Pakistani journalist and poet (b. 1929)
2000 – Abdul Haris Nasution, Indonesian Military (b. 1918)
  2005   – Eugenia Charles, Dominican lawyer and politician, 2nd Prime Minister of Dominica (b. 1919)
2007 – Madeleine L'Engle, American author and poet (b. 1918)
  2007   – Luciano Pavarotti, Italian tenor (b. 1935)
2008 – Anita Page, American actress (b. 1910)
2009 – Catherine Gaskin, Irish-Australian author (b. 1929)
2010 – Boris Chetkov, Russian painter (b. 1926)
  2010   – Clive Donner, English director and editor (b. 1926)
2011 – Michael S. Hart, American author, founded Project Gutenberg (b. 1947)
2012 – Elisabeth Böhm, German architect (b. 1921)
  2012   – Lawrie Dring, Scottish scout leader, founded World Federation of Independent Scouts (b. 1931)
  2012   – Jerome Kilty, American actor and playwright (b. 1922)
  2012   – Art Modell, American businessman (b. 1925)
  2012   – Oscar Rossi, Argentinian footballer and manager (b. 1930)
  2012   – Terry Nutkins, English naturalist, television presenter and author (b. 1946)
2013 – Ann C. Crispin, American author (b. 1950)
  2013   – Khin Maung Kyi, Burmese economist and scholar (b. 1926)
  2013   – Santiago Rosario, Puerto Rican-American baseball player and coach (b. 1939)
2014 – Odd Bondevik, Norwegian bishop and theologian (b. 1941)
  2014   – Cirilo Flores, American bishop (b. 1948)
  2014   – Seth Martin, Canadian ice hockey player and coach (b. 1933)
  2014   – Kira Zvorykina, Belarusian chess player and educator (b. 1919)
2015 – Ralph Milne, Scottish footballer (b. 1961)
  2015   – Martin Milner, American actor (b. 1931)
  2015   – Barney Schultz, American baseball player and coach (b. 1926)
  2015   – Calvin J. Spann, American general and pilot (b. 1924)
2017 – Peter Luck, Australian journalist and television host (b. 1944)
  2017   – Kate Millett, American feminist author and activist (b. 1934)
2018 – Richard DeVos, American billionaire businessman (b. 1926)
  2018   – Liz Fraser, English actress (b. 1930)
  2018   – Will Jordan, American comedian and actor (b. 1927)
  2018   – Burt Reynolds, American actor, director and producer (b. 1936)
2019 – Robert Mugabe, Zimbabwean politician, 2nd President of Zimbabwe (b. 1924)
2020 – Lou Brock, American baseball player (b. 1939)
2021 – Jean-Paul Belmondo, French actor (b. 1933)
  2021   – Michael K. Williams, American actor (b. 1966)

Holidays and observances
 Christian feast days:
 Begga 
 Chagnoald
 Faustus, Abibus and Dionysius of Alexandria
 Gondulphus of Metz
 Magnus of Füssen
 Onesiphorus
 Zechariah (Hebrew prophet) (Catholic church)
 September 6 (Eastern Orthodox liturgics)
 The earliest date on which the Abbots Bromley Horn Dance is performed
 Armed Forces Day (São Tomé and Príncipe)
 Defence Day or Army Day (Pakistan)
 Flag Day (Bonaire)
 Independence Day (Swaziland), celebrates the independence of Eswatini from the United Kingdom in 1968
 Unification Day (Bulgaria)

References

External links

 
 
 

Days of the year
September